The Valjevo Mountain Range (Ваљевске планине, Valjevske planine) is a highland in Serbia, in the north-eastern part of the Dinaric Alps. It stretches for about 50 km west of Valjevo towards Mačva and forms a natural border between the north-western and southern Serbia.

Its major mountains include Debelo Brdo (1,094m), Magleš (1,036m), Medvednik (1,247m), Jablanik (1,275), Povlen (Mali Povlen: 1,347m), Maljen (Kraljev sto: 1,104m) and Suvobor (866m), the latter including Ravna Gora highland and Rajac mountain. On Povlen lays the source of the Sušica river.

See also
Mountains of Serbia

References

External links

Mountain ranges of Serbia
Dinaric Alps